Schweizer Fernsehen (SF; "Swiss Television") is the German-language division of SRG SSR, in charge of production and distribution of television programmes in Switzerland for German-speaking Switzerland. It has its head office in Zürich. Its most viewed programme is Tagesschau (news), daily at 7:30 pm.

It was formerly called SF DRS (Schweizer Fernsehen der deutschen und rätoromanischen Schweiz; "Swiss television of German and Romansh Switzerland") until 2005. On 1 January 2011, Schweizer Fernsehen and Schweizer Radio DRS began the process of merging the two entities into Schweizer Radio und Fernsehen (SRF). On 16 December 2012, the merger was complete, with SF and SR DRS adopting the SRF name to their television and radio stations.

History
 1939: First test transmissions of television
 1964: Introduction of advertising
 1968: Colour transmissions begin
 1984: Introduction of teletext
 1984: Launch of 3sat, in collaboration with ZDF in Germany and ORF in Austria
 1997: Launch of SF zwei
 1999: Launch of SF info in the Zürich region
 2001: SF info begins broadcasting to the whole of German-speaking Switzerland
 2005: SF DRS becomes SF, accompanying a major re-brand of the network.
 2007: Launch of HD suisse in 720p quality (in co-operation with TSR and RSI)
 2012: HDTV transmission (not all programmes yet) of SF 1, SF zwei and SF info; HD suisse was closed in return

Television channels
 SRF 1
 SRF zwei
 SRF info

See also 
 Television in Switzerland

References

External links

 www.srf.ch 

Swiss Broadcasting Corporation
Defunct television channels in Switzerland
Mass media companies of Switzerland
Publicly funded broadcasters
Television networks in Switzerland
German-language television networks
German-language television in Switzerland
Television channels and stations established in 1958
Television channels and stations disestablished in 2012
1958 establishments in Switzerland
2012 disestablishments in Switzerland